Javier "Javi" Guerra Rodríguez (born 15 March 1982) is a Spanish former professional footballer who played as a striker.

He amassed Segunda División totals of 247 games and 86 goals over eight seasons, representing in the competition Cádiz, Granada 74, Alavés, Levante, Valladolid and Rayo Vallecano. He added 120 matches and 40 goals in La Liga, with Valencia, Valladolid, Málaga and Rayo.

Club career

Early years and Valencia
Guerra was born in Vélez-Málaga, Andalusia. After beginning professionally with lowly Motril CF in Segunda División B, he appeared sporadically for neighbouring Cádiz CF in the following season, after which he moved to La Liga with Valencia CF.

Guerra's stay with the Che would be quite unassuming, as he only managed to appear twice in the league in three years, totalling slightly more than ten minutes in a 3–0 loss at Getafe CF and a 3–2 home win against RCD Espanyol.

Released in June 2007, Guerra resumed his career in the Segunda División, with consecutive relegations with Granada 74 CF and Deportivo Alavés (the latter already owned by RCD Mallorca, which also loaned the player for the 2009–10 campaign, to Levante UD).

Valladolid
In August 2010, after greatly helping the Valencian Community team return to the top division, scoring 12 league goals which was second-best in the squad and joint-11th in the competition, Guerra left Mallorca permanently, signing a four-year contract with another side in the second tier, Real Valladolid, for free – the Balearic Islands club would only have to be paid if his new team promoted or decided to sell again. He had a breakthrough season in his first year, bettering his previous best by 12 goals and finishing second in the top scorers' list: highlights included braces against Recreativo de Huelva (2–0, at home), SD Huesca (2–0, home), SD Ponferradina (2–1, home), UD Salamanca (5–0, away), FC Barcelona B (2–1 home) and AD Alcorcón (2–0, home), and a hat-trick against CD Numancia (4–5 defeat, home).

Guerra continued with his fine form in the promotion playoffs, scoring the game's only goal in the first leg with Elche CF at the Estadio Nuevo José Zorrilla, in an eventual 3–2 aggregate loss. He netted significantly less in 2011–12, but two of his 17 goals included one in each leg of the promotion playoffs against Alcorcón, with Valladolid winning 2–1 on aggregate and returning to the top flight after two years.

On 16 December 2013, Guerra took his season tally to ten after scoring all of his team's goals in a 3–0 home defeat of RC Celta de Vigo. On 5 February of the following year, he signed a pre-contract agreement with Premier League club Cardiff City, with the deal being made effective in the summer after his link expired.

Cardiff City
Guerra was officially presented as a new Cardiff City player on 21 May 2014, signing a three-year contract. He made his debut for the club on 16 August, coming on as a substitute for Kenwyne Jones for the last 22 minutes of a 3–1 victory over Huddersfield Town at Cardiff City Stadium.

Having made only three bench appearances during the season, Guerra was loaned to Málaga CF on 15 January 2015, until June.

Rayo Vallecano
On 31 August 2015, Guerra joined Rayo Vallecano on a two-year deal. With 12 goals, he was the team's top scorer in his first season as they suffered relegation; this included two in the first ten minutes of a 2–1 home victory against Granada CF on 7 November.

Guerra extended his contract on 11 July 2016 to remain in Vallecas until 2019. His input was more limited as they won the 2017–18 Segunda División and were instantly demoted back, and on 30 June 2019 his link expired.

Personal life
Guerra's twin brother, Emilio, was also a footballer and a forward. He spent the vast majority of his career in the Spanish lower leagues.

Career statistics

Honours
Rayo Vallecano
Segunda División: 2017–18

Notes

References

External links

1982 births
Living people
People from Vélez-Málaga
Spanish twins
Twin sportspeople
Sportspeople from the Province of Málaga
Spanish footballers
Footballers from Andalusia
Association football forwards
La Liga players
Segunda División players
Segunda División B players
Tercera División players
UE Vilassar de Mar players
Motril CF players
Cádiz CF players
Valencia CF Mestalla footballers
Valencia CF players
Granada 74 CF footballers
RCD Mallorca players
Deportivo Alavés players
Levante UD footballers
Real Valladolid players
Málaga CF players
Rayo Vallecano players
Liga Portugal 2 players
Varzim S.C. players
English Football League players
Cardiff City F.C. players
Spanish expatriate footballers
Expatriate footballers in Portugal
Expatriate footballers in Wales
Spanish expatriate sportspeople in Portugal
Spanish expatriate sportspeople in Wales